Camp Mack is a fishing lodge, RV resort campground and recreation event venue in the historic town of Lake Wales, Florida situated on the Kissimmee River, in the heart of the Kissimmee Chain of Lakes.  In March, 2018 the lodge was rebranded Camp Mack, a Guy Harvey Lodge, Marina and RV Resort, affiliating itself with Guy Harvey Outpost Collection, the lodging arm of the noted marine scientist, artist, and conservation advocate Dr. Guy Harvey.  The camp’s “old Florida” riverfront setting offers bass fishing enthusiasts access to Lake Kissimmee, Hatchineha, Cypress and Tohopekaliga and is host of numerous bass fishing tournaments.  A variety of sporting and musical events use the riverfront setting as a backdrop, including Rockin’ on the River, an annual country music festival supporting autism.  The Kissimmee River watershed comprises 3,000 square miles, supporting a diverse community of waterfowl, wading birds and other wildlife, in addition to its national reputation for holding trophy size largemouth bass. Camp Mack has been a 'fish camp' for well over 100 years [2] and on a geological map from 1836, this area was described as Tyson's Camp.[3] In the 1980s RV sites were added[4] and in 2006, the camp expanded to 225 RV sites and cabins and a 40 unit lodge was opened.  The riverfront setting includes 85 boat slips, a major boat ramp and a general store standing for over 80 years. Other camp amenities include a guest clubhouse, swimming pool and a variety of food and beverage options. Adjoining Camp Mack is Lake Kissimmee State Park with over 13 miles of hiking/biking trails, 6 miles of equestrian trails and a destination along the Great Florida Birding & Wildlife trail.

Camp Mack has been featured on television shows related to fishing including on ESPN during the 2005 Bassmasters Citgo Southern Open and on Sweetwater Fishing TV. The Bellamy Brothers filmed their Catahoula music video at Camp Mack and on Lake Kissimmee in 1997. The Lighthouse starring Danny Glover, directed by Martin Glover was filmed at Camp Mack's River Resort in 2012. Other notable recent events held at Camp Mack include the live broadcast of Trophy Takers Outdoor radio show hosted by Lee Cepero and the 5th annual Bobby Lane Cup, a youth fishing tournament held by Major League Fishing Pro Bobby Lane.

History

Camp Mack occupies a high bluff along an oxbow of the Kissimmee River at the eastern edge of Polk County, an area described as Tyson's Camp on an 1836 geological map. A pair of wealthy executives with the Coca-Cola Company – Leon Grady (L.G) Bruce and the man known as "Mr. Mack" — acquired the land in the early 20th century and created a private retreat for company employees from Tampa.  L.G's wife Josie Bruce worked in the general store for many years.

Leon Denton and the Denton family (wife Gladys and sons Jackie and Ronnie) of Lake Wales acquired Camp Mack in the 1940s and operated it as a fishing camp until 1983. Leon Denton and his family hosted many individuals at Camp Mack over the years including Billy Graham, Cowboy Luttrell, Jack Dempsey, Gen. James A. Van Fleet, Bob Woodruff, Ray Graves, Charley Pell, and Ben Hill Griffin, Jr. The airboat company, Alligator Cove Airboat Nature Tours, owned by Andy Denton, the son of Jackie, is headquartered at Camp Mack.

In 1983, Pate Snively bought the resort. Snively, whose grandfather settled in Winter Haven in 1900, added an RV park and a campground before selling the resort in 1999 

In 1999, Billy Farris, (Far-Ed Corp.,) purchased the resort from Pate Snively and they significantly expanded the facilities in 2006 with the addition of 65 RV sites, a 40 unit motel and an indoor storage facility.

In 2015, a closely held family company, managed and owned by Michael Daugherty, purchased the resort from Far Ed, (now Ed-Far) Billy Farris.

Camp Mack gets many visitors from the United Kingdom, Europe and Canada   who come to see the theme parks, then come to Camp Mack to see natural Florida.

Fishing tournaments, airboat events, professional fishermen

Camp Mack hosts fishing tournaments or airboating events nearly every weekend. Some of the larger tournaments in the past have been the Bassmaster Citgo Southern Open in 2005. In 2009 and 2010, Camp Mack was the host to 3 Walmart Bass Fishing League events (affiliated with Fishing League Worldwide).  Many professional fishermen come to fish at Camp Mack including MLF professionals Bobby and Chris Lane. The Lakeland Junior Bassmasters have many tournaments there hosted by Martin Bozeman, President, and they had their year-end awards banquet there in December 2015. The Kissimmee River Valley Sportsman's Association (KRVSA) has their annual Lake Clean Up at Camp Mack where the airboaters remove garbage from the Kissimmee Chain of Lakes. KRVSA has been awarded the Florida Wildlife Federation's Conservation Organization of the year three times. The KRVSA Freedom Ride has also stopped at Camp Mack.

Lake Kissimmee and Camp Mack

Lake Kissimmee is a 34,948-acre lake between Lake Wales and Yeehaw Junction in central Florida. In 1996, the Florida Wildlife Commission revitalized 24 miles of shoreline, resulting in increased numbers of largemouth bass in the lake. According to The World Fishing Network, Lake Kissimmee has double the average catch rate for Bass in the state and has very consistent bass production. With the State of Florida's new Trophy Catch program (started in 2013), many anglers have caught and released bass larger than 8 pounds on Lake Kissimmee and have received $100 after doing so. In the Florida Sportsman magazine article "on Trophy Waters" (February 2015), it highlighted Van Soles of Haines City as the first Florida angler to have a tournament catch accepted into the Trophy Catch Hall of Fame with a greater than 13 lb catch. The tournament was launched at Camp Mack and the fish was officially weighed and released also at Camp Mack's River Resort. The weight was 13 lb 2 ounces and it was caught on December 20, 2013.

Lake Kissimmee consistently ranks as one of the best bass fishing lakes in the US. Lake Kissimmee is the #1 bass lake in Florida according to Florida Sportsman magazine in 2018. Fishhound ranked Lake Kissimmee as #24 in its Top 100 Bass Waters in the US. In 2012, the World Fishing Network listed the Top 10 Bass Fishing Lakes in Florida and Lake Kissimmee was listed there. Lake Kissimmee is considered one of the top crappie lakes in Florida according to Florida Sportsman from the magazine in 2012.

The Kissimmee Chain of Lakes is also known for hunting. Duck hunting, deer hunting and wild hog hunting are all very popular and many hunting excursions are launched out of Camp Mack. According to Polkcountyoutdoors.com journalist, Ian Nance, "the Kissimmee Chain of Lakes region has long been a sportsman's dream".

Camp Mack has also been written about in various publications. It was ranked the 5th best Fish Camp in Florida by the website: Onlyinyourstate.com. In Florida Travel + Life's 6th annual 52 Amazing Weekends, Camp Mack was one of the 52 weekends classified in the Time out with the Boys: Hall Pass (Mancation) section. On travelchannel.com, Camp Mack was listed as "one of the fun things to do in Winter Haven". In an article about alligators, Trailer Life's journalist Bill Graves, describe this part of Lake Wales along the Kissimmee River and Camp Mack's River Resort as "America's Outback".

Charity events and fishing tournaments

Numerous charity fishing and airboating events are held at Camp Mack. Below are some recent events.   
The 2nd annual Rockin' on the River charity event was held at Camp Mack's River Resort on February 28, 2016 and approximately 3,000 people were there on Saturday. The charity event was started by John Straughn and the net proceeds go to the Children's Academy of Lake Wales and SideStreet Art Beat, Inc., both 501 (c)(3) not for profit organizations.

Bassmaster Elite Series pro fisherman Bobby Lane held the 5th annual Bobby Lane Cup at Camp Mack on December 3, 2015. "This is something I started in 2011," Bobby Lane said, "and it's one of the things I'm most proud of in my career. The tournament is one of the ways I try to give back to the sport of bass fishing and to our youth." There is no entry fee and the top fishermen or women are awarded scholarships.

Nearby and more history

The Lake Kissimmee State Park, containing 5,930 acres of land, is located near the end of Camp Mack Road across from the Camp Mack property. The State Park has frontage on the Kissimmee River with over 13 miles of hiking/biking trails and 6 miles of equestrian trails. The Lake Kissimmee State Park is also on the Great Florida Birding & Wildlife trail.

Camp Mack is on the  Kissimmee Chain of Lakes Personal Water Craft (PWC) Trail. The Kissimmee Chain of Lakes trail is 126 miles long according to the website pwctrailfinder.com.

According to the Lake Kissimmee State Park Website, during the Civil War the area was used for raising cattle that were shipped to the Confederate Army or traded with Cuba for supplies. After the war, cattle became the main industry and this continues to the present day. In 1969, the state of Florida purchased 5,030 acres of land from the William Zipperer estate for use as a state park. Lake Kissimmee State Park was opened to the public in August 1977. An additional 900 acres was purchased in 1997 and added to the park's western boundary.

Right near Camp Mack and Lake Kissimmee State Park on the banks of the Kissimmee River was Fort Gardiner. Fort Gardiner was established December 2, 1837 by Colonel Zachary Taylor on his march to the Battle of Okeechobee and was named for Captain George Washington Gardiner who died in the Dade Massacre in 1835 fighting the Seminole tribe. Myrtle Hilliard Crow writes in Old Tales and Trails of Florida that "troops marching from Fort Brooke at Tampa Bay traveled east until they reached the Kissimmee River. On the east side of the river between lakes Hatchineha and Kissimmee, they chopped down pines for a crude log stockade they named Fort Gardiner." Steamboats stopped right near Camp Mack and old Fort Gardiner in the late 1800 and early 1900 according to the book, When Steamboats reigned in Florida by Bob Bass. In a video by the Polk County, Florida government, the Lillie and Naoman steamboats were pictured in the oxbow of the Kissimmee River near Camp Mack. These two steamboats were also referenced in the book When Steamboats reigned in Florida as boats that were on the Kissimmee River.

See also
 LEGOLAND Florida
 Bok Tower Gardens

References

External links
 
 Florida boat ramp finder

Campgrounds in the United States
Lake Wales, Florida
Florida
Tourist attractions in Polk County, Florida
Resorts in Florida